Three ships of the Royal Navy have borne the name HMS Princess Mary or HMS Princess Maria:

  was a 38-gun ship captured in 1652 and wrecked in 1658.
  was a yacht built in 1688.  She was sold at some point, becoming a merchant ship.  She remained in service until 1827 under the name Betty Cairns.
She was relaunched in 1742 as HMS Princess Mary, and was sold in 1766.
  was a minesweeper lost to a mine in the Aegean on 8 February 1919.

See also

References

Royal Navy ship names